Ognyan Stefanov (born 4 August 1986) is a Bulgarian football player, currently playing as a forward.

References

External links

Living people
1986 births
Bulgarian footballers
PFC Pirin Gotse Delchev players
PFC Spartak Varna players
First Professional Football League (Bulgaria) players
Association football forwards